In 2000 "The James River Plantations - Charles City County, Virginia" created the Jamestown Discovery Trail as a heritage trail to provide visitors with a meaningful route forward in direction, but back in time, to Jamestown, Virginia.  The trail begins at the junction of Interstate 295 (Virginia) and Virginia State Route 5 in Henrico County and continues on Virginia Route 5 through Charles City County and into James City County.  In James City County the trail continues on Greensprings Road and culminates at the terminus of the Colonial Parkway at Jamestown Island.

The Jamestown Discovery Trail incorporates open-to-the-public historic sites designated as official sites of the trail by "The James River Plantations - Charles City County, Virginia" and public parks designated as official sites of the trail, as well as state and local historic highway markers located along the trail.  Collectively the historic sites, public parks and historic highway markers provide visitors with the historical legacy of the establishment of Jamestown in 1607.  In 2006 "Jamestown 2007 Discovery Trail" markers were installed along the Jamestown Discovery Trail by the Virginia Department of Transportation: These markers were removed in 2008, although the route remains a wonderful approach or exit from Jamestown.

Trail markers
Historic Sites and Historic Highway Markers - Beginning at Interstate 295 heading toward Jamestown Island
Historic Highway Marker - Pocahontas 
Historic Highway Marker - Henrico Town 
Historic Highway Marker - Proposed First University in English America 
Historic Highway Marker - Marker Varina 
Historic Highway Marker - Battle of New Market Heights 
Historic Highway Marker - Marker New Market Road 
Public Park - Deep Bottom Park, County of Henrico 
Historic Highway Marker - Nathaniel Bacon 
Historic Highway Marker - Curles Neck & Bremo 
Historic Highway Marker - Turkey Island 
Historic Highway Marker - Engagement at Malvern Cliffs 
Historic Site - Richmond National Battlefield Park 
Historic Highway Marker - Malvern Hill 
Historic Highway Marker - Scene of Jefferson's Wedding 
Historic Highway Marker - Wayside and Granville 
Historic Highway Marker - Shirley Plantation 
Historic Site - Edgewood Plantation and Harrison's Mill
Historic Site and Historic Highway Marker - Berkeley Plantation 
Historic Site and Historic Highway Marker - Westover Plantation 
Historic Highway Marker - Herring Creek and Kimages 
Historic Highway Marker - Salem Church 
Historic Highway Marker - Evelynton Plantation 
Historic Highway Marker - Grant's Crossing 
Historic Highway Marker - Swineyards and Willcox Wharf 
Public Park - Park Lawrence Lewis, Jr. Park, Charles City County 
Historic Highway Marker - Greenway, Birthplace of John Tyler 
Historic Highway Marker - Charles City Court House and Charles City County Center for Local History 
Historic Site - Belle Air Plantation 
Historic Site and Historic Highway Marker - Piney Grove at Southall's Plantation 
Historic Highway Marker - Court House and New Hope 
Historic Site and Historic Highway Marker - North Bend Plantation 
Historic Highway Marker - Kittiewan and Dr. Rickman 
Historic Highway Marker - Upper Weyanoke 
Historic Highway Marker - Parrish Hill and Weyanoke 
Historic Site and Historic Highway Marker - Sherwood Forest Plantation 
Historic Highway Marker - Kennon's and Sturgeon Point 
Historic Highway Marker - Kennon's Landing 
Historic Highway Marker - Sherwood Forest - President Tyler's Home 
Historic Highway Marker - Sandy Point and Cherry Hall 
Historic Highway Marker - Piney Grove and E.A. Saunders 
Public Park - Chickahominy Riverfront Park, James City County 
Historic Highway Marker - Battle of Greensprings 
Historic Highway Marker - First Africans in English America 
Public Park - Jamestown Settlement 
Historic Site - Jamestown National Historic Site

See also

List of James River plantations

External links 
Jamestown Discovery Trail - Official Site
Jamestown Discovery Trail - Virginia Tourism Corporation

Tourist attractions in Charles City County, Virginia
Historical markers in the United States
Native American history of Virginia
African-American history of Virginia